William L. Abingdon (2 May 1859 – 17 May 1918) was an English stage actor who settled in the United States. As well as enjoying a lengthy theatre career, he also appeared in four silent films during the 1910s.

Filmography
 Manon Lescaut (1914)
 The Kiss of Hate (1916)
 Panthea (1917)
 Fedora (1918)

References

Bibliography
 Paul Fryer, Olga Usova. Lina Cavalieri: The Life of Opera's Greatest Beauty, 1874-1944. McFarland, 2003.

External links

 W. L. Abingdon at IBDb.com

1859 births
1918 deaths
English male stage actors
British emigrants to the United States
People from Towcester